Fərzalı (also, Farzaly) is a village in the Gadabay District of Azerbaijan. The village forms part of the municipality of Arabachy.

References 

Populated places in Gadabay District